Bonifati is a town and comune in the province of Cosenza in the Calabria region of southern Italy.

Administration
Bonifati is, to date, the only Italian comune to have had the same female mayor for three electoral terms.

People
Alessandro Rosina, Italian former footballer who played as an attacking midfielder or winger.

References

Cities and towns in Calabria